Don't Need You may refer to:

 "Don't Need You", a 1993 song from the split album Yeah Yeah Yeah Yeah by Bikini Kill
 "Don't Need You", a 2016 song by Bullet for My Valentine
 "Don't Need You", a 2020 song by Genesis Owusu

See also
 "I Don't Need You"